Moniruddin Yusuf (13 February 1919 – 11 February 1987) was a Bangladeshi writer, journalist and translator.

Background and education
Yusuf was born in a wealthy Bengali Muslim zamindar family of Boulai in Kishoreganj. His family spoke Urdu at home. His father was Maulvi Misbah, and the family were of Mughal descent. Initially educated by an Urdu-speaking tutor, he later studied at the local Middle English school, Ramananda High School at Kishoreganj before moving on to studying at the Mymensingh Zilla School. He passed the intermediate examination from Dhaka Intermediate College in 1940. He then attended University of Dhaka.

Career
Yusuf moved to Dhaka and joined the Pakistan Observer and later The Sangbad as a journalist. He later worked at the Public Relations Department of the Bangladesh Agricultural Development Corporation until 1979.

Works

Awards
 Governor's Gold Medal
 Habib Bank Literary Award
 Bangla Academy Literary Award (1978)
 Abul Mansur Ahmed Literary Award 
 Ekushey Padak (1993)

References

1919 births
1987 deaths
Bangladeshi journalists
Bangladeshi male writers
Recipients of the Ekushey Padak
Recipients of Bangla Academy Award
People from Kishoreganj District
20th-century journalists
Urdu-speaking Bangladeshi
20th-century Bengalis
Bangladeshi translators
Pakistani journalists